The St. Paul Canadiens are a junior "B" ice hockey team based in St. Paul, Alberta, Canada. They were founded in 1953 as the St. Paul Chevrolets. In 1954 Clarence (Clancy) Richard formed the St.Paul Junior B Canadiens. They are members of the North Eastern Alberta Junior B Hockey League (NEAJBHL). As a Western Canadian Junior B franchise, the Canadiens are eligible for the Keystone Cup.

The Canadiens' organization hosted the 2017 Russ Barnes Provincial Championships.

Season-by-season record
Note: GP = Games played, W = Wins, L = Losses, OTL = Overtime Losses, Pts = Points, GF = Goals for, GA = Goals against, PIM = Penalties in minutes

Russ Barnes Trophy
Alberta Jr. B Provincial Championships

External links
Official website of the St. Paul Canadiens

Ice hockey teams in Alberta
County of St. Paul No. 19